Clypeomorus bifasciata persica is a subspecies of sea snail, a marine gastropod mollusk in the family Cerithiidae.

Description
The size of the shell varies between 9 mm and 15 mm.

Distribution
This marine species occurs in the Persian Gulf.

References

 Houbrick R.S. 1985. Genus Clypeomorus Jousseaume (Cerithiidae: Prosobranchia). Smithsonian Contributions to Zoology 403: 1–131

External links
 

Clypeomorus